BGO can refer to:

 Bismuth germanate, a scintillating chemical compound
 BGO Records (Beat Goes On), a British record label
 Battlestar Galactica Online, an MMO by Bigpoint
 Bergen Airport, Flesland (IATA: BGO) in Bergen, Norway
 Burke-Gaffney Observatory, at Saint Mary's University in Halifax, Nova Scotia, Canada